Czosnów  is a village in Nowy Dwór County, Masovian Voivodeship, in east-central Poland. It is the seat of the gmina (administrative district) called Gmina Czosnów.

The village has a population of 420.

References

Villages in Nowy Dwór Mazowiecki County
Warsaw Governorate
Warsaw Voivodeship (1919–1939)